Głębokie-Pilchowo is a municipal neighbourhood of the city of Szczecin, Poland situated on the left bank of Oder river, north-west of the Szczecin Old Town, in Zachód (West) District. As of January 2011 it had a population of 1,216.

Głębokie-Pilchowo comprises Głębokie and Pilchowo.

References 

Neighbourhoods of Szczecin